The Aboriginal heritage inquiry system, or AHIS, is a database providing information concerning Aboriginal heritage places in Western Australia.

Aboriginal heritage sites in Western Australia are protected under the Aboriginal Heritage Act 1972, with information on these sites accessible through the Aboriginal heritage inquiry system.

References

External links
 Aboriginal heritage inquiry system database (map)
 Aboriginal Heritage Inquiry System User Guide

History of Indigenous Australians
Heritage registers in Australia